The Cambodian Super Cup, previously the CNCC Charity Cup, is a super cup tournament in Cambodia played between the winners of the Cambodian Premier League and the Hun Sen Cup. The first edition was played in 2017. Due to the lack of public interest and financial limitation, the cup was put on hiatus for 4 years from 2018 to 2021. The competition was revived and renamed to the Cambodian Super Cup in 2022, with Phnom Penh Crown as the latest champion.

Matches
Below is a list of the Super Cup winners. Since its creation, if one team wins the domestic double, then league runners-up are invited as the second team.

Performance by team

All-time top goalscorers
Bold indicates active players in Cambodian football.

References

Football competitions in Cambodia
National association football supercups